3-D Ultra Pinball is video game released in 1995, and is the first game in 3-D Ultra Pinball video game series.

Gameplay
The original 3-D Ultra Pinball game was released in 1995. This game is based on the space simulation game Outpost. There are three tables named "Colony", "Command Post", and "Mine". Each table holds a set of five challenges. Smaller "mini-tables" are featured with their own set of flippers. The goal is to build and launch a starship, completing the game's entire course.

Reception
Reviewing the Macintosh version, a Next Generation critic commented that "there is some substance to the argument that pinball is not a game meant for the monitor, but 3-D Ultra Pinball works, and it works very well". He particularly praised the fact that the graphics and physics both include elements not possible on a real pinball table, while remaining "true to the pinball spirit". Despite this, he gave it only two out of five stars. It received a score of 3.5 out of 5 from MacUser.

According to market research firm PC Data, 3-D Ultra Pinball was the 18th-best-selling computer game in the United States for the year 1996. According to Sierra On-Line, its sales surpassed 250,000 copies by the end of March 1996.

Development 
A port on the Sega Saturn was planned, but it was cancelled for unknown reasons.

Reviews
 PC Gamer (December 1995)

References

External links
Review in InfoWorld

1995 video games
Cancelled Sega Saturn games
Classic Mac OS games
Dynamix games
Pinball video games
Sierra Entertainment games
Single-player video games
Video games developed in the United States
Windows games